Moanasaurus (From Māori moana "sea" and Greek sauros "lizard"; meaning "Sea Lizard") was a genus of mosasaur from the Late Cretaceous period. Its fossil remains have been discovered in the North Island of New Zealand. Moanasaurus was a very large mosasaurine known originally from a disarticulated skull, vertebrae, ribs and flipper bones. The skull measures  in length, which shows that Moanasaurus was one of the largest in the subfamily of Mosasaurinae. Researchers argue that some Antarctic Mosasaurus remains (including a "large, fragmentaery skull") may be attributed to this genus.

See also

List of dinosaurs and other Mesozoic reptiles of New Zealand

References

External links

 Oceans of Kansas

Mosasaurines
Mosasaurs of Oceania
Fossils of New Zealand
Fossil taxa described in 1980
Taxa named by Joan Wiffen

Extinct animals of New Zealand